Thumamah Airport  is an airport located near ath-Thumamah in northeastern Riyadh, Saudi Arabia. It is located about 28.9 km (18 mi) north of King Khalid International Airport.

See also

 List of longest runways
 Saudi Aviation Club

External links
Thumamah Airport at the Saudi Aviation Club

Airports in Saudi Arabia